Azaloxan (CGS-7135A) is a drug which was patented as an antidepressant by Ciba-Geigy in the early 1980s, but was never marketed.

Synthesis
Thymoleptic described as a “psychostimulant” according to patent title.

The halogenation of allyl cyanide [109-75-1] (1) with bromine gives 3,4-dibromobutyronitrile [25109-74-4] (2). This is further reacted with catechol [120-80-9] (3) to give the 1,4-benzodioxan-2-yl-acetonitrile [18505-91-4] (4). Acid catalyzed hydrolysis of the nitrile to the acid gives 1,4-benzodioxan-2-yl-acetic acid [18505-92-5] (5). The reduction of this to alcohol with sodium bis(2-methoxyethoxy)aluminium hydride gives 2-(1,4-benzodioxan-2-yl)ethanol [62590-71-0] (6). The tosylation of this intermediate gives CID:12850582 (7).

See also 
 Idazoxan
 Piperoxan

References 

Antidepressants
Benzodioxans
Imidazolidinones
Piperidines